Hudson House may refer to:

 Hudson-Jones House, Arkadelphia, Arkansas, listed on the National Register of Historic Places (NRHP)
 Hudson House (Pine Bluff, Arkansas), NRHP-listed
 Hudson-Grace-Borreson House, Pine Bluff, Arkansas, NRHP-listed
 Morrow-Hudson House, Tempe, Arizona, listed on the NRHP in Maricopa County, Arizona
 Alfred L. Hudson House, Kenton, Delaware, NRHP-listed
 Hudson-Nash House and Cemetery, Lilburn, Georgia, listed on the NRHP in Gwinnett County, Georgia
 Hudson House (Walton, Kentucky), listed on the NRHP in Boone County, Kentucky
 Hudson House (Oxford, Massachusetts), NRHP-listed
 Hudson-Evans House, Detroit, Michigan, NRHP-listed
 Hudson House (Albuquerque, New Mexico), listed on the NRHP in Bernalillo County, New Mexico
 Robert A. Hudson, also known as Hudson House Inc., a former produce packaging and sales company based in Portland, Oregon
 Nelson Hudson House, Darlington, South Carolina, NRHP-listed
 Dr. Taylor Hudson House, Belton, Texas, listed on the NRHP in Bell County, Texas